Aashirvaad is a brand of staple food and kitchen ingredients owned by ITC Ltd. The Aashirvaad brand was launched in 2002 and its range of products include atta flour, salt, spices, instant food mixes, dairy products and superfoods.

Products

Atta
ITC entered the branded atta (packaged wheat flour) market with the launch of Aashirvaad Atta in Bengal and Chandigarh on 26 May 2002. The product is now available all over India. The Aashirvaad package is PET Poly, with the design showcasing the farming process undertaken in the rural heartland of India in the form of a Madhubani painting.

Aashirvaad Select Atta is made from Sharbati wheat which comes from Sehore district Madhya Pradesh.

Salt
ITC launched branded packaged salt under the brand name ‘Aashirvaad Salt’ on 26 March 2003.

Spices
ITC forayed into the branded spices market with the launch of Aashirvaad Spices in Northern India in May 2005. The offering currently consists of chili, turmeric and coriander powder.

The company entered organic foods retailing in July 2007 with the launch of Aashirvaad Select Organic Spices comprising chili, turmeric and coriander powders.

Instant food mixes
This range, launched in March 2006, includes gulab jamun, rava idli, rice idli, rice dosa, dhokla, khaman, rasmalai and vada mix. In 2021, it entered the ready-to-mix Indian breakfast sector with instant poha, upma, sambar and suji halwa mixes.

Multi-purpose cooking paste
The ‘Aashirvaad’ Multi-Purpose cooking paste ‘’, is a fried paste of onions, tomatoes, ginger and garlic shallow fried in refined sunflower oil. It is a basic paste used for most North Indian dishes.

Dairy
Aashirvaad entered packaged dairy segment in 2015 with the launch of ghee. The dairy division also includes milk, curd, paneer, lassi and mishti doi sold under 'Aashirvad Svasti' brand.

References

External links
 Aashirvaad Official Site
 ITC Foods, Aashirvaad
 Aashirvaad Sugar Release Control Atta site

Indian brands
Salt industry in India
Companies based in Kolkata
Products introduced in 2002
ITC Limited